Dichaetophora is a genus of flowering plants in the family Asteraceae.

There is only one known species, Dichaetophora campestris, native to Chihuahua, Nuevo León, and southern Texas.

References

Flora of Texas
Flora of Northeastern Mexico
Astereae